Harper is an unincorporated community in Decatur County, Indiana, in the United States.  It was also called Bigrest.

History
The first post office, called Bigrest, opened in 1881. Renamed Harper in 1882, the post office was discontinued in 1907.

References

Unincorporated communities in Decatur County, Indiana
Unincorporated communities in Indiana